Denmark competed at the 2008 Summer Olympics in Beijing, People's Republic of China. This is a list of all of the Danish athletes who qualified for the Olympics and their results. The goal set out by Team Danmark and the Danish Sports' Union (Dansk Idræts-Forbund, DIF) was seven medals. The distribution of gold, silver and bronze medals in this goal were not specified.

Team Danmark and DIF believed Denmark had the best chances of winning a medal in wrestling, cycling, handball, the equestrian events, rowing, athletics, badminton and sailing, but hoped to see table tennis and triathlon make the podium as well.

The entire Danish Olympic squad was announced on 21 June 2008 with final confirmation on 8 July.

On 14 August, placing third in the equestrian team dressage event, Denmark won its first medal at the 2008 Summer Olympics.

Medalists

Archery

Athletics

Men

Women

Badminton

Men

Women

Mixed

Canoeing

Sprint

Qualification Legend: QS = Qualify to semi-final; QF = Qualify directly to final

Cycling

Road

Track
Pursuit

Omnium

Mountain biking
Men

BMX

Equestrian

Dressage

Eventing

Gymnastics

Trampoline

Handball

Men's tournament

Roster

Group play

Quarterfinal

Classification semifinal

7th–8th place

Rowing

Men

Women

Qualification Legend: FA=Final A (medal); FB=Final B (non-medal); FC=Final C (non-medal); FD=Final D (non-medal); FE=Final E (non-medal); FF=Final F (non-medal); SA/B=Semifinals A/B; SC/D=Semifinals C/D; SE/F=Semifinals E/F; QF=Quarterfinals; R=Repechage

Sailing

Men

Women

Open

M = Medal race; EL = Eliminated – did not advance into the medal race; CAN = Race cancelled;

Shooting

Men

Swimming

Men

Women

Table tennis

Tennis

Triathlon

Wrestling

Men's Greco-Roman

See also
 Denmark at the 2008 Summer Paralympics

References

External links
ol.dk  – the Danish Olympics Committee's homepage for the Danish Olympic team

Nations at the 2008 Summer Olympics
2008
Summer Olympics